Plesiolena bonneti is a species of mygalomorph spiders in the family Actinopodidae. It is found in Chile.

References

Actinopodidae
Spiders described in 1961
Endemic fauna of Chile